William Cushing may refer to:

William Cushing (1732–1810), early associate justice of the United States Supreme Court
William B. Cushing (1842–1874), United States Navy officer
William Henry Cushing (1852–1934), Canadian politician 
William Orcutt Cushing (1823–1902), American hymn writer